The Sound of Drums is a double album by Australian electronic rock band Rogue Traders, including their debut compilation album The Greatest Hits and the fourth studio album Night of the Living Drums. The album did not chart in Australia.  The album's title is a reference to the Doctor Who episode of the same name, which featured "Voodoo Child" prominently.

Background
Night of the Living Drums was initially set for release on 25 June 2010, however due to certain unknown reasons and troubles with the record label Sony Music the album was not released that year.

The album is the first release from the band with new lead singer Mindi Jackson who replaced Natalie Bassingthwaighte after the latter departed the band in 2009. The album also features a new drummer Peter Marin and the return of guitarist Tim Henwood, who left the band during 2008.

On October 24, 2011, the band posted on Facebook that the album would be released as the second disc of a double-disc titled The Sound of Drums. The first disc is a greatest hits compilation. "I'll Be Your Stalker" and "Hearts Beat as One", although being recorded for the album, did not make an appearance on the album's track list and were included on single releases.

Track listing

References

External links

Rogue Traders albums
2011 albums